Eraldo is a male given name of Italian origin.

People with the given name Eraldo include:

 Eraldo Anicio Gomes, Brazilian footballer
 Eraldo Bernocchi, Italian musician, producer and sound designer
 Eraldo Correia, Brazilian footballer
 Eraldo Da Roma, Italian film editor 
 Eraldo Monzeglio, Italian footballer
 Eraldo Pecci, Italian footballer
 Eraldo Pizzo, Italian water polo player

Italian masculine given names